Hebbasur  is a village in the southern state of Karnataka, India. It is located in the Chamarajanagar taluk of Chamarajanagar district.

Demographics
 India census, Hebbasur had a population of 5076 with 2586 males and 2490 females.

See also
 Chamarajanagar
 Districts of Karnataka

References

External links
 http://Chamarajanagar.nic.in/

Villages in Chamarajanagar district